James J. McCormick  (December 31, 1861 – September 11, 1905) was a third baseman in Major League Baseball for the 1883 Baltimore Orioles of the American Association and the 1884 Philadelphia Keystones and Washington Nationals of the Union Association.

Sources

1861 births
1905 deaths
19th-century baseball players
Major League Baseball third basemen
Baltimore Orioles (AA) players
Philadelphia Keystones players
Washington Nationals (UA) players
Jersey City Skeeters players
Bridgeport Giants players
Boston Blues players
Meriden Silvermen players
Toronto Canucks players
Easton (minor league baseball) players
Reading (minor league baseball) players
Harrisburg (minor league baseball) players
Harrisburg Ponies players
Lebanon Cedars players
Syracuse Stars (minor league baseball) players
Reading Actives players
Lebanon Pretzel Eaters players
Scranton Indians players
Scranton Miners players
Baseball players from Philadelphia